"Hot Love" is a song by English glam rock band T. Rex, released as a standalone single on 12 February 1971 by record label Fly. It was the group's first number one placing on the UK Singles Chart, where it remained at the top for six weeks beginning on 20 March 1971.

The two performances of the song on Top of the Pops in March 1971, which saw Marc Bolan dressed for the first time on television in shiny satin stagewear and glittery make-up (the latter at the suggestion of his stylist Chelita Secunda) were a crucial trigger for the glam rock movement. In a UK poll in 2015 it was voted eleventh on the ITV special The Nation's Favourite 70s Number One.

Background and recording

"Hot Love" was recorded at Trident Studios on 21 and 22 January 1971. The single's B-sides, "Woodland Rock" and "The King of the Mountain Cometh", were recorded onto the same 16-track tape.

The A-side, along with B side track "Woodland Rock", marks the first time a full drum kit appeared on a T. Rex song, after Bill Fifield participated in the session at Tony Visconti's suggestion. The single was issued and, due to its success, Fifield was invited to audition to join the band, adopting the stage name Bill Legend. "King of the Mountain Cometh" was the only track ever on record by the Bolan/ Finn/ Currie trio, although officially they were the whole band for all three tracks on this record.

Personnel
Permanent band members:
Marc Bolan – lead vocals, guitar
Steve Currie – bass guitar
Mickey Finn – handclaps
Other:
Bill Fifield – drums
Tony Visconti – string arrangement
Howard Kaylan and Mark Volman – backing vocals

Release 
“Hot Love” was released as a single on 12 February 1971 by record label Fly. It became the group's first number one placing on the UK Singles Chart, where it remained at the top for six weeks beginning in March 1971. The single, however, did not fare as well in the US, where it peaked at number 72 on the Billboard Hot 100 and at number 54 on the Cash Box Top 100. The song reached number 47 in Canada in June 1971, number 4 in Australia and number 12 in South Africa.

Use in advertising and films
“Hot Love” featured in the 1996 film Breaking the Waves and the 1998 film The Acid House.

The song featured in the Christmas 2020 advertising campaign for the on-line retailer Very.

References

Other sources

External links 

 

1971 singles
1971 songs
UK Singles Chart number-one singles
Irish Singles Chart number-one singles
T. Rex (band) songs
Songs written by Marc Bolan